The Evangelical School was a Greek educational institution established in 1733 in Smyrna, Ottoman Empire, now Izmir, Turkey. The school, initially an Orthodox Church-approved institution, attracted major figures of the Modern Greek Enlightenment. During the late 19th-early 20th century it became the most important Greek school in the city, possessing an archaeological museum, a natural science collection and a library, which contained some 50,000 volumes and 180 manuscripts. The Evangelical School ceased its operation in 1922 as a result of the Turkish capture of Smyrna.

Early years and Greek Enlightenment
The school originated as a church approved institution and was established after the efforts of the local Greek Orthodox bishop. It was originally known as Greek School, while its name changed several times during the 18th century. Finally, at 1808 the Ecumenical Patriarch granted the appellation, Evangelical School, by which it would be known until 1922. Financially, until the Greek War of Independence (1821-1830), the school was supported by individual benefactors, who either offered money directly to the school or sponsored scholarships for students.

In 1747 the school came under the protection of the British consulate of the city after the initiative of the local merchant Pantoleon Sevastopoulos. Sevastopoulos, in order to secure the school against a possible Ottoman confiscation, managed to acquire the full protection of Great Britain, something that was recognized by the Ottoman Sultans.

The Evangelical School, was initially orientated towards a traditional, religious-centered model of education. However, it saw two progressive interludes, probably due to rivalry with the Philological Gymnasium, another Greek school of the city, until the later was closed down by force in 1819 due to conservative reactions. During the following years a number of progressive headmasters were appointed. In 1811, Theophilos Kairis became headmaster, followed by Benjamin of Lesbos in 1820, both of them figures of the modern Greek Enlightenment and two of the most eminent representatives of the group of reform mathematics teachers from the Eastern Aegean region. Especially, Kairis taught mathematics and physics, but soon he left the school due to the differences in his views with those of the school board.

Later period (1830–1922)

With the years the school adopted more progressive and rationalistic educational methods, as well as the teaching of modern mathematics and sciences in the 'Western' manner, which at times attracted the attention of the conservative circles of the Ecumenical Patriarchate.

At the late 19th and early 20th century, Smyrna was a major commercial and educational center of the Greek world. The city was the home of 67 well-equipped Greek school units in addition to 4 female schools. The Evangelical school during this period was the most important Greek educational institution in the city. Apart from the schools, it possessed an archaeological museum, significant natural science collection, and an excellent library which contained some 50,000 volumes and 180 manuscripts.

Numerous graduates of the school such as Giorgos Tsitseklis and Nikos Manganiotis, despite being citizens of the Ottoman Empire volunteered for the Greek Army. The new and bigger building of the school was saved from the Great Fire of Smyrna and after it, the school building was used as the Hospital of the Levantines for approximately 1.5-2 years and served as a hospital. Upon the increase in the Turkish-Muslim population in İzmir after the War of Independence in 1924, the Girls' High School, which continued its education in the Karataş District, moved to Namık Kemal High School with all its belongings and started education as Girls' Vocational High School.

In memory of the Evangelical School, a new school was founded in Nea Smyrni district, Athens, in 1934 called New Evangelical School. On the other hand, the educational facilities in Izmir today used to be Turkish public schools.

Notable graduates
Ambrosios Pleianthidis, metropolitan bishop
Saint Nicodemus the Hagiorite
Saint Daniel Katounakiotis
Manolis Kalomiris
Adamantios Korais
Nick the Greek
Aristotle Onassis
Timotheos Evangelinidis
Stelios Zeimbekos

References

Sources

Education in İzmir
Education in the Ottoman Empire
Modern Greek Enlightenment
Greeks from the Ottoman Empire
1733 establishments in the Ottoman Empire
1922 disestablishments in the Ottoman Empire
Megali Idea